Alex Tronic Records (ATR) is a record label based in Scotland who primarily release electronic music. Their current artists include Alex Tronic, ÅsA, Becki Bardot, Keser, Pockets of Resistance, Binary Zero, Iain Carnegie, Marvin Wilson, Matthew Leigh Embleton (aka Snakestyle), Minnie Rogers, Neu Gestalt, The Psychedelic Manifesto, Roys Iron DNA, 30K, Integra TV, Forward Play, Metaltech, Pixlface, Melvitronica and Fiolent V.

Artists 
Alex Tronic
ÅsA
Becki Bardot
Binary Zero
Cosway
Dirt Diamond
Drupad
Fiolent V
Forward Play
Iain Carnegie
Integra TV
Keser
Marvin Wilson
Matthew Leigh Embleton
Melvitronica
Metaltech
Minnie Rogers
Neu Gestalt
Pandacetamol
Pixlface
Pockets of Resistance
The Psychedelic Manifesto
Roys Iron DNA
Snakestyle (aka Matthew Leigh Embleton)
Synthologist
30K

Catalogue 
Albums

Compilations

ATR Classical

Background 
Label founder Alex Tronic - (Paul Croan) had previously released and licensed music to many labels notably Koyote/Peyote Records and Cherry Red Records in 2000. He also scored music for film and TV.

Alex Tronic Records was created in 2005 and their debut release was ÅsA - On/Off which was released to widespread acclaim. Other signings followed including Keser, Roys Iron DNA and Pockets of Resistance.

Keser and ÅsA went on to tour in Scandinavia after their releases. Roys Iron DNA toured with the Lo-Fidelity Allstars and The Go! Team.

Alex Tronic Records' own Recording Studio in central Edinburgh was proving to be pivotal in discovering newly emerging talent as well as developing their current artists.

The label's first compilation album brought these talents together and was a successful venture. The Skinny magazine described the album as "a brilliant exhibition of talent... On the whole the album is extremely varied. The only thing which doesn’t change is the production quality and raw talent, which is consistent throughout."

Future Music magazine awarded the Alex Tronic Volume 1 compilation album 7/10 and described it as "an eclectic and engaging debut...well worth checking out"

ATR Volume 1 gained radio play worldwide including BBC Radio 1.

In 2007 Alex Tronic Records signed distribution deals with Cargo Records in the U.K. and Arabesque which covers European territories, and more signings soon followed.

Croan's own album 'Alex Tronic - To Infinity' was released on ATR in February 2009, and features contributions from artists on ATR. A follow up was released in 2010 entitled 'Back in the Room', and another entitled 'Shifting Sands' in 2011.

Alex Tronic's Electricals EP (2012) features vocalist Kirsty Brown and also includes remixes by ATR artist Snakestyle. The ideas and recordings for the EP began during Summer 2011, when Croan relocated to Ibiza to DJ and record. The EP was completed in Edinburgh during winter 2011/2012.

Alex Tronic and Becki Bardot's Balearica sessions EP features vocals from Sally Stapleton and was also released in 2012.

See also 
 Lists of record labels
 List of independent UK record labels

References

External links 
 Alex Tronic Records Official Website
 UK Distribution
 Worldwide Distribution
 Skinny Magazine, ATR Article
 Metaltech
 Matthew Leigh Embleton / Snakestyle
 Minnie Rogers
 The Psychedelic Manifesto
 Neu Gestalt website

Electronic music record labels
British independent record labels
Alternative rock record labels
Record labels established in 2005